The Murgash Wind Farm is a proposed wind power project in Murgash, Bulgaria. It will have 50 individual turbines with a nominal output of around 2 MW which will deliver up to 100 MW of power.

See also

Plambeck Bulgarian Wind Farm
Kavarna Wind Farm
Stara Planina Wind Farm

References

Proposed wind farms in Bulgaria